Kennedy Bridge may refer to:

 Kennedy Bridge (Austria), across the Wien river in Vienna, Austria
 Kennedy Bridge (Adana), crossing the Seyhan River in Adana, Turkey
 Kennedy Bridge (Bonn), across the Rhine River in Bonn, Germany
 Kennedy Bridge (Bremerhaven), across the Geeste in Bremerhaven, Germany
 Kennedy Bridge, Bundaberg, a heritage-listed bridge across Bundaberg Creek, Queensland, Australia
 Kennedy Bridge (Hamburg), across the Alster in Hamburg, Germany
 Kennedy Bridge (Minnesota), in Mankato, Minnesota, United States
 Kennedy Bridge (Niamey), the main crossing for the Niger River, in Niamey, Niger
 Kennedy Bridge (Kimberton, Pennsylvania), in Chester County, Pennsylvania, United States

See also
 John F. Kennedy Bridge (Germany), across the Isar, in Munich, Germany
 John F. Kennedy Boulevard Bridge, across the Schuylkill River in Pennsylvania, United States
 John F. Kennedy Memorial Bridge across the Ohio River, connecting Louisville, Kentucky and Jeffersonville, Indiana, United States
 Eastvale Bridge, officially known as the John F. Kennedy Memorial Bridge, across the Beaver River in Pennsylvania, United States